The Vale of Clwyd is a constituency of the House of Commons of the UK Parliament created in 1997 and represented since 2019 by James Davies of the Conservative Party. As with all extant seats its electorate elect one Member of Parliament (MP) by the first past the post system at least every five years.

The Vale of Clwyd Senedd constituency was created with the same boundaries in 1999 (as an Assembly constituency).

Boundaries

1997–2010: The Borough of Rhuddlan, the District of Glyndwr wards of Denbigh Central, Denbigh Lower, Denbigh Upper, Henllan, and Llandyrnog, and the Borough of Colwyn ward of Trefnant.

2010–present: The Denbighshire County electoral divisions of Bodelwyddan, Denbigh Central, Denbigh Lower, Denbigh Upper/Henllan, Dyserth, Llandyrnog, Prestatyn Central, Prestatyn East, Prestatyn Meliden, Prestatyn North, Prestatyn South West, Rhuddlan, Rhyl East, Rhyl South, Rhyl South East, Rhyl South West, Rhyl West, St Asaph East, St Asaph West, Trefnant, and Tremeirchion.

The constituency was created in 1997 from the seats of Clwyd North West, Clwyd South West and Delyn. It is in the north of Wales containing the seaside town of Prestatyn and its coastal neighbour Rhyl which is overlooked by the community of Rhuddlan. It also contains the inland towns of Denbigh, St Asaph, Bodelwyddan, Trefnant and Tremeirchion.

Political history
The seat was won by the Labour candidate in 1997, 2001, 2005 and on a marginal majority in 2010.  The seat was next won by the Conservative candidate standing in 2015.  The 2015 result gave the seat the 4th most marginal majority of the Conservative Party's 331 seats by percentage of majority. However, Labour regained the seat in the 2017 general election with more than half the eligible votes, the first Labour gain from the Conservatives on the night. In 2019 general election, the seat reverted to the Conservatives as the party made gains from Labour in north east Wales.

Members of Parliament

Elections

Elections in the 1990s

Elections in the 2000s

Elections in the 2010s

Of the 55 rejected ballots:
32 were either unmarked or it was uncertain who the vote was for.
23 voted for more than one candidate.

Of the 77 rejected ballots:
60 were either unmarked or it was uncertain who the vote was for.
16 voted for more than one candidate.
1 had writing or mark by which the voter could be identified.

Of the 91 rejected ballots:
72 were either unmarked or it was uncertain who the vote was for.
18 voted for more than one candidate.
1 had writing or mark by which the voter could be identified.

Of the 84 rejected ballots:
76 were either unmarked or it was uncertain who the vote was for.
8 voted for more than one candidate.

See also
 Vale of Clwyd (Senedd constituency)
 List of parliamentary constituencies in Clwyd
 List of parliamentary constituencies in Wales

External links
Politics Resources (Election results from 1922 onwards)
Electoral Calculus (Election results from 1955 onwards)
2017 Election House Of Commons Library 2017 Election report
A Vision Of Britain Through Time (Constituency elector numbers)

References

Parliamentary constituencies in North Wales
Constituencies of the Parliament of the United Kingdom established in 1997